Saperda obliqua is a species of beetle in the family Cerambycidae. It was described by Thomas Say in 1826. It is known from Canada and the United States.

References

obliqua
Beetles described in 1826